Raoul Hedebouw (born 12 July 1977) is a Belgian politician who has served as the president of the Workers' Party of Belgium (PVDA-PTB) since 2021. He previously served as the national spokesperson of the party until 2021, as well as fraction leader in the Belgian Chamber of Representatives. He furthermore serves as member of the Liège City Council.

Youth
Raoul Hedebouw was born in Herstal, Liège on July 12th 1977 in a Dutch speaking Flemish family, he was raised bilingually, both in Dutch and in French. Hedebouw grew up in a working-class neighbourhood, with his mother working in a factory producing medical equipment and his father as a steelworker in ArcelorMittal. In 1992, his mother was fired, which impacted Hedebouw's views: "What happened to my mother, has been a decisive factor in my engagement."

Hedebouw went to study biology and botany at the University of Liège.

Political career
Hedebouw joined the Marxist PVDA-PTB and became its spokesperson in 2008. He was first elected as council member in Liège after the local elections of 2012. After the federal elections of 2014 he became one of the first two federal MPs for the PVDA-PTB. Hedebouw often gives his speeches in the Chamber in both Dutch and French, changing from one language to the other between sentences.

Knife attack
When preparing for a speech for the International Workers' Day on May 1st 2017, Hedebouw was attacked and stabbed in the leg. The damage was limited and Hedebouw was able to finish his speech before being taken to hospital, sustaining only a mild injury to his thigh.

Bibliography
 Première à gauche. Entretien avec Gilles Martin (Left first, an interview with Gilles Martin, Editions Aden, 2013)

See also
 Workers' Party of Belgium
 Peter Mertens

Notes

References

1969 births
Living people
Politicians from Liège
21st-century Belgian politicians
Members of the Chamber of Representatives (Belgium)
Workers' Party of Belgium politicians